Hermes França Barros (born August 26, 1974) is a Brazilian mixed martial artist. He has competed for the UFC, WEC, MFC, and Israel FC. He is a former WEC Lightweight Champion, and former UFC Lightweight Championship contender.

Mixed martial arts career

Early career
França made his professional Mixed Martial Arts debut on 17 November 2001, with a win over future WEC Featherweight Champion Mike Skinner.  He quickly earned an undefeated streak of 6–0, finishing all his opponents under the limit of the second round, drawing the attention of the UFC.

First UFC run
França made his UFC debut at UFC 42, defeating Richard Crunkilton by unanimous decision. He won his next UFC fight against Caol Uno (who narrowly missed the lightweight championship after drawing with B.J. Penn) at UFC 44 before losing a majority decision to Josh Thomson at UFC 46.

His next outing in the UFC, against Yves Edwards, was unsuccessful, losing the fight by split decision. Edwards would once again beat França by split decision in their encounter at Euphoria: USA vs. World in 2005, starting what would be a very bad year – marked with three straight losses – for the Brazilian fighter.

After UFC release
However, 2006 would prove to be a much better year for França. In March, he toppled WEC champion Gabe Ruediger to capture the WEC Lightweight championship and then knocked out Team Quest fighter Ryan Schultz to take the AFC Lightweight championship in April.

França continued his winning streak against the likes of Toby Imada and Brandon Olsen before signing a contract to fight Roger Huerta at UFC 61 in July. Although França's opponent was changed – Huerta pulled out due to injury, with UFC newcomer Joe Jordan taking his place – França still reigned successful in his UFC return, stopping Jordan by triangle choke submission in the third round.

Second UFC run
On August 4, 2006, it was revealed that França had accepted a late-notice fight with Jamie Varner at UFC 62. França came in as a late replacement for Spencer Fisher, who injured his back while preparing for the fight. Despite accepting the fight on short notice, França reigned victorious, catching Varner in an armbar submission in the third round.

França successfully defended his WEC Lightweight championship against Nathan Diaz, brother of UFC veteran Nick Diaz, at WEC 24 on October 12, extending França's win streak in 2006 to seven consecutive victories.

França won his fight against Spencer Fisher at UFC Fight Night 8 by TKO in the second round; after his victory he got down on his knees (à la Georges St-Pierre) and begged UFC President Dana White to grant him a title shot against Sean Sherk. During the post-fight press conference White confirmed that França would be given a title shot at UFC 73. França lost to Sean Sherk by unanimous decision. On July 19, 2007, the California State Athletic Commission announced França had tested positive for the banned steroid Drostanolone in a post-fight drug test following his championship fight at UFC 73. He had been suspended from competing in California until July 5, 2008 and had been fined $2,500.

He has since left The Armory and was then removed from their main site as an instructor.

Franca spent early January 2008 helping BJ Penn train for his five-round fight against Joe Stevenson for the vacant UFC lightweight championship at UFC 80.

França lost his first fight in the UFC since his suspension in 2007 on July 19, 2008, to Frankie Edgar via unanimous decision.

He then defeated Marcus Aurélio via unanimous decision at UFC 90 on October 25, 2008.

França was scheduled to fight Joe Lauzon on February 7 in the main event for UFC Fight Night 17. However, França pulled out of the event with a torn anterior crucial ligament in his right knee. França made his return against Tyson Griffin on September 19, 2009, at UFC 103. Franca lost his fight to Tyson Griffin in the second round via TKO (Punches) after Griffin caught him with a straight right followed up by brutal ground and pound, eventually knocking out França for his second ever KO loss.

After his defeat at the hands of Tyson Griffin at UFC 103, França was released by the organization, along with other UFC veterans, Chris Wilson, Marcus Aurélio and Justin McCully.

After second UFC release
Following the loss to Eric Wisely and losing four out of his last five fights, Franca announced through his manager, Reed Wallace, his retirement.

Franca has since come out of retirement and has bounced back after an 0-3-1 record in four fights during 2010. Franca won via submission in February 2011 then scored two wins in April 2011 defeating Robert Washington and Josh Thorpe.

Xtreme Vale Todo 5 controversy
At the Xtreme Vale Todo 5 event in Costa Rica on December 19, 2010, Hermes Franca was awarded a judges' decision over Ferrid Kheder before the promoter, Lu Dwyer, attempted to overturn it, causing widespread controversy. In addition to the fight's announcer, all three judges and the referee had scored the bout in favor of Franca. Regardless of the actual scores, Lu Dwyer declared Kheder the victor, and another promoter raised Kheder's hand in victory after the referee refused to do so.

There is a potential conflict of interest because Kheder is primarily sponsored by Dwyer and her business J & L Irrigation. Dwyer sponsors "Team FK" by paying his living expenses and taking a percentage of his winnings.

Days after his controversial decision win, Ferrid Kheder posted on his Facebook page that Dwyer decided to overturn the fight result to a "No Contest" and suggested a five-round rematch, presumably in the same promotion.

Arrest, sexual abuse of minor, MFC termination, and prison sentence
Franca appeared to be back on track, winning at MFC 29 and being slotted in to fight Drew Fickett for the promotion's vacant lightweight championship at MFC 30 on June 10, 2011. Franca, however, turned himself in to Clackamas County Sheriff's officials in mid-May 2011 and was charged with multiple sexual battery charges. This was related to him sexually abusing a minor who was a student at his training facility in Clackamas, OR. MFC president Mark Pavelich then terminated Franca's contract on May 19, 2011, citing the arrest and Franca having fought two times outside of the organization, breaching his contract.

Franca pleaded guilty to one count of attempted unlawful penetration and was sentenced to 42 months in state prison; he was also sentenced to four and a half years probation after he serves his prison sentence and must register as a sex offender.

Return to MMA
Following his arrest and deportation to Brazil, Franca returned from a three-year retirement and faced Marcio Breno at Extreme Fighter: Nordeste on August 28, 2014. He lost the bout via first-round knockout.

Personal life 
Franca and his wife have one son. Franca lost his father when he was 14.

Championships and accomplishments

Mixed martial arts
World Extreme Cagefighting
WEC Lightweight Champion (One time; third)
Tied (Jamie Varner; Gabe Ruediger) for most consecutive successful defenses in the Lightweight division
Tied (Jamie Varner; Gabe Ruediger) for most successful defenses in the Lightweight division
Ultimate Fighting Championship
Fight of the Night (Three times)
Submission of the Night (One time)
HOOKnSHOOT
HnS Featherweight Champion (One time)

Mixed martial arts record

|-
|Loss
|align=center| 26–20 (1)
|Vaso Bakočević
|TKO (punches)
|Megdan Fighting 4 - Selected
|
|align=center| 1
|align=center| 1:45
|Novi Sad, Serbia
|
|-
|Loss
|align=center| 26–19 (1)
| Rafael da Silva Cordeiro
| TKO (punches)
| TSFBR 1 - Super Fight Brazil
| 
|align=center| 1
|align=center| 2:36
|Teresina, Piauí, Brazil
|
|-
|Win
|align=center| 26–18 (1)
| Roger Vieira
| Submission (guillotine choke)
| TWC 5 - The Warriors Combat 5
| 
|align=center| 1
|align=center| 3:02
|Brasília, Brazil
|
|-
|Loss
|align=center| 25–18 (1)
| Lionel Padilla Suarez
| Decision (unanimous)
| AFL 14 - Outbreak
| 
|align=center| 3
|align=center| 5:00
|Las Palmas, Canary Islands, Spain
|
|-
|Win
|align=center| 25–17 (1)
| Fozil Nuralizoda
| TKO (doctor stoppage)
| TFC 5 - Tajikistan Fighting Championship 5
| 
|align=center| 1
|align=center| 3:18
|Dushanbe, Tajikistan

|
|-
|Win
|align=center| 24–17 (1)
| Eduardo Andrade
| Decision (unanimous)
| Aspera Fighting Championship 53
| 
|align=center| 3
|align=center| 5:00
|Fortaleza, Ceará, Brazil
|
|-
|Loss
|align=center| 23–17 (1)
| Zhang Lipeng
| Decision (unanimous)
| Kunlun Fight MMA 9
| 
|align=center| 3
|align=center| 5:00
|Sanya, Hainan China
|
|-
|Loss
|align=center| 23–16 (1)
| Fanil Rafikov
| KO (punches)
| Akhmat Fight Show 12
| 
|align=center| 1
|align=center| 1:14
|Astana, Kazakhstan
|
|-
|Loss
|align=center| 23–15 (1)
| James Silveira
| TKO (punches)
| Action Fight 2
| 
|align=center| 2
|align=center| 2:11
|Caucaia, Ceará, Brazil
|
|-
|Win
|align=center| 23–14 (1)
| Khasan Askhabov
| Submission (guillotine choke)
| Battle in Grozny 5
| 
|align=center| 2
|align=center| 2:37
|Grozny, Chechnya, Russia
|
|-
|Loss
|align=center| 22–14 (1)
| Shamil Zavurov
| KO (punch)
| Grozny Fights 3
| 
|align=center| 1
|align=center| 0:42
|Grozny, Chechnya, Russia
| 
|-
| Loss
| align=center| 22–13 (1)
| Márcio Breno
| KO (punches)
| Extreme Fighter: Nordeste
| 
| align=center| 1
| align=center| 0:34
| Fortaleza, Ceará, Brazil
| 
|-
| Loss 
| align=center| 22–12 (1) 
| Thawa Ril
| KO (punches) 
| International Fighter Championship 
|  
| align=center| 2
| align=center| 0:56 
| Pernambuco, Brazil 
| 
|-
| Win 
| align=center| 22–11 (1) 
| Josh Thorpe
| Submission (rear-naked choke) 
| Gladiator Cage Fights - Knockout Night 1 
|  
| align=center| 1
| align=center| 1:36 
| Marion, Illinois, United States 
| 
|-
| Win 
| align=center| 21–11 (1)
| Robert Washington
| TKO (punches) 
| MFC 29: Conquer
|  
| align=center| 2
| align=center| 0:26 
| Windsor, Ontario, Canada 
| 
|-
| Win 
| align=center| 20–11 (1)
| Jorge Sarat
| Submission (armbar) 
| GForce Promotions: Bad Blood 5
|  
| align=center| 1
| align=center| 2:27 
| Grand Rapids, MI, United States 
| 
|-
| NC
| align=center| 19–11 (1) 
| Ferrid Kheder 
| NC (overturned)
| Xtreme Vale Todo 5 
|  
| align=center| 3
| align=center| 5:00 
| Cartago, Costa Rica 
| 
|-
| Loss 
| align=center| 19–11
| Moshe Kaitz 
| Decision (unanimous) 
| Israel FC: Genesis 
|  
| align=center| 3
| align=center| 5:00 
| Tel Aviv, Israel
| 
|-
| Loss 
| align=center| 19–10
| Eric Wisely
| Decision (unanimous) 
| Scorpius Fighting Championships 1 
|  
| align=center| 3
| align=center| 5:00 
| Fort Lauderdale, Florida, United States
|
|-
| Loss 
| align=center| 19–9
| Eric Wisely
| TKO (punches) 
| Max Fights DM Ballroom Brawl IV 
|  
| align=center| 1
| align=center| 2:03 
| West Des Moines, Iowa, United States
| 
|-
| Loss 
| align=center| 19–8
| Tyson Griffin 
| KO (punches) 
| UFC 103 
|  
| align=center| 2
| align=center| 3:26 
| Dallas, Texas, United States
| 
|-
| Win 
| align=center| 19–7
| Marcus Aurélio 
| Decision (unanimous) 
| UFC 90 
|  
| align=center| 3
| align=center| 5:00 
| Rosemont, Illinois, United States
| 
|-
| Loss 
| align=center| 18–7
| Frankie Edgar 
| Decision (unanimous) 
| UFC Fight Night: Silva vs. Irvin 
|  
| align=center| 3
| align=center| 5:00 
| Las Vegas, Nevada, United States
| 
|-
| Loss 
| align=center| 18–6
| Sean Sherk 
| Decision (unanimous) 
| UFC 73 
|  
| align=center| 5
| align=center| 5:00 
| Sacramento, California, United States
| 
|-
| Win 
| align=center| 18–5
| Spencer Fisher 
| TKO (punches) 
| UFC Fight Night 8 
|  
| align=center| 2
| align=center| 4:03 
| Hollywood, Florida, United States
| 
|-
| Win 
| align=center| 17–5
| Nate Diaz 
| Submission (armbar) 
|  WEC 24: Full Force
|  
| align=center| 2
| align=center| 2:46 
| Lemoore, California, United States
| 
|-
| Win 
| align=center| 16–5
| Jamie Varner  
| Submission (armbar) 
| UFC 62: Liddell vs. Sobral
|  
| align=center| 3
| align=center| 3:31 
| Las Vegas, Nevada, United States
| 
|-
| Win 
| align=center| 15–5
| Joe Jordan
| Submission (triangle choke) 
| UFC 61: Bitter Rivals
|  
| align=center| 3
| align=center| 0:47 
| Las Vegas, Nevada, United States
| 
|-
| Win 
| align=center| 14–5
| Brandon Olsen 
| Submission (armbar) 
|  WEC 21: Tapout
|  
| align=center| 1
| align=center| 0:40 
| Highland, California, United States
| 
|-
| Win 
| align=center| 13–5
| Toby Imada 
| Submission (armbar) 
| TC 14: Throwdown 
|  
| align=center| 1
| align=center| 0:53 
| Del Mar, California, United States
| 
|-
| Win 
| align=center| 12–5
| Ryan Schultz 
| KO (punches)
| AFC 16: Absolute Fighting Championships 16 
|  
| align=center| 1
| align=center| 3:30 
| Fort Lauderdale, United States
| 
|-
| Win 
| align=center| 11–5
| Gabe Ruediger 
| KO (punches) 
| WEC 19: Undisputed
|  
| align=center| 1
| align=center| 0:36 
| Lemoore, California, United States
| 
|-
| Loss 
| align=center| 10–5
| Kotetsu Boku
| Decision (majority)
| Hero's 3 
|  
| align=center| 2
| align=center| 5:00 
| Tokyo, Japan
| 
|-
| Loss 
| align=center| 10–4
| Ray Cooper 
| KO (punches) 
| Shooto Hawaii: Unleashed 
|  
| align=center| 1
| align=center| 2:57 
| Honolulu, Hawaii, United States
| 
|-
| Loss 
| align=center| 10–3
| Yves Edwards 
| Decision (split) 
| Euphoria: USA vs World 
|  
| align=center| 3
| align=center| 5:00 
| Atlantic City, New Jersey, United States
| 
|-
| Win 
| align=center| 10–2
| Manny Reyes Jr. 
| KO (punches) 
| AFC 10: Absolute Fighting Championships 10 
|  
| align=center| 1
| align=center| 0:37 
| Fort Lauderdale, Florida, United States 
| 
|-
| Win 
| align=center| 9–2
| Phil Johns 
| Submission (rear-naked choke) 
| Euphoria: Road to the Titles 
|  
| align=center| 1
| align=center| 0:47 
| Atlantic City, New Jersey, United States
| 
|-
| Loss 
| align=center| 8–2
| Yves Edwards 
| Decision (split) 
| UFC 47 
|  
| align=center| 3
| align=center| 5:00 
| Las Vegas, Nevada, United States
| 
|-
| Loss 
| align=center| 8–1
| Josh Thomson
| Decision (unanimous) 
| UFC 46 
|  
| align=center| 3
| align=center| 5:00 
| Las Vegas, Nevada, United States
| 
|-
| Win 
| align=center| 8–0
| Caol Uno 
| KO (punch) 
| UFC 44 
|  
| align=center| 2
| align=center| 2:46 
| Las Vegas, Nevada, United States
| 
|-
| Win 
| align=center| 7–0
| Richard Crunkilton 
| Decision (unanimous) 
| UFC 42 
|  
| align=center| 3
| align=center| 5:00 
| Miami, Florida, United States
| 
|-
| Win 
| align=center| 6–0
| Ryan Diaz 
| Submission (guillotine choke) 
| HOOKnSHOOT: Absolute Fighting Championships 
| 
| align=center| 1
| align=center| 4:23 
| Fort Lauderdale, Florida, United States
| 
|-
| Win 
| align=center| 5–0
| Anthony Hamlett 
| TKO (punches) 
| HOOKnSHOOT: New Wind 
|  
| align=center| 1
| align=center| N/A
| Evansville, Indiana, United States
| 
|-
| Win 
| align=center| 4–0
| Yohei Suzuki
| Submission (guillotine choke) 
| HOOKnSHOOT: Relentless 
|  
| align=center| 1
| align=center| 1:04 
| Evansville, Indiana, United States
| 
|-
| Win 
| align=center| 3–0
| Don Kaecher 
| Submission (armbar) 
| WEF 12: World Extreme Fighting 12 
|  
| align=center| 2
| align=center| 2:00 
| Steubenville, Ohio, United States
| 
|-
| Win 
| align=center| 2–0
| Mike Willus 
| Submission (triangle choke) 
| HOOKnSHOOT: Overdrive 
|  
| align=center| 1
| align=center| 4:00 
| Evansville, Indiana, United States
| 
|-
| Win 
| align=center| 1–0
| Mike Brown 
| Submission (triangle choke) 
| HOOKnSHOOT: Kings 1 
|  
| align=center| 1
| align=center| 2:21 
| Evansville, Indiana, United States
|

See also 
 List of male mixed martial artists

References

External links 
 
 

Brazilian practitioners of Brazilian jiu-jitsu
Brazilian male mixed martial artists
Lightweight mixed martial artists
Mixed martial artists utilizing Brazilian jiu-jitsu
World Extreme Cagefighting champions
1974 births
Living people
Sportspeople from Fortaleza
Brazilian expatriate sportspeople in the United States
Brazilian sportspeople in doping cases
Doping cases in mixed martial arts
Brazilian criminals
People awarded a black belt in Brazilian jiu-jitsu
Ultimate Fighting Championship male fighters
Kunlun Fight MMA Fighters
People convicted of sex crimes